The Titi d'Or is an annual award presented by Les Titis du PSG to the most promising and best talents in the Paris Saint-Germain Academy. Les Titis du PSG is an association affiliated to Paris Saint Germain that covers news of the club's academy. The prize has been awarded to male players since 2007, with an exception in 2010 due to technical reasons. Since 2019, it has also been presented to the most gifted female player.

Voting was open to the public until 2011, but the winners are now elected by their teammates. Players from under-17, under-19 and reserve teams who have not played more than five matches for PSG's professional team are eligible to win the trophy. The most recent recipients of the award are male midfielder Warren Zaïre-Emery and female goalkeeper Océane Toussaint, who won the 2022 Titi d'Or.

Winners
As of 27 January 2023.

Men

Women

References

External links

Official websites
PSG.FR - Site officiel du Paris Saint-Germain
Paris Saint-Germain - Ligue 1
Paris Saint-Germain - UEFA.com

Paris Saint-Germain F.C.
Association football trophies and awards
Awards established in 2007